Christopher Moore (January 20, 1952 – March 13, 2022) was an American curator, journalist and historian based in New York City who helped save, document and later create what is now known as the African Burial Ground in Lower Manhattan.

He worked as an editor for the National Black Network, and as an actor appeared in As the World Turns and on stage in an Off Broadway production of A Soldier's Play. Moore also served as a member of New York City's Landmarks Preservation Commission. As a historian, he served as research director of the Schomburg Center. Working as an author, he wrote about African-American culture and history including: Fighting For America: Black Soldiers and co-authored Slavery In New York, The Black New Yorkers: 400 Years of African American History and Standing In the Need of Prayer: African American Prayer Traditions. Moore wrote and co-produced The African Burial Ground: An American Discovery for the History Channel as part of his broader research into the city's history with slaves.

Moore died from COVID-19 pneumonia at a hospital in Brooklyn on March 13, 2022. He was 70.

References

1952 births
2022 deaths
Deaths from the COVID-19 pandemic in New York (state)
20th-century African-American people
20th-century American historians
20th-century American male actors
Male actors from New York City
Writers from New York City